This Old House is an American home improvement media brand with television shows, a magazine and a website, ThisOldHouse.com. The brand is headquartered in Stamford, CT. The television series airs on the American television station Public Broadcasting Service (PBS) and follows remodeling projects of houses over a number of weeks.

<onlyinclude>

Note: Episodes are listed in the original broadcast order

Season 1 (1979)
Bob Vila's first season as the host.
This is the first season to have Fats Waller's "Louisiana Fairy Tale" as the original This Old House theme song.

Season 2 (1981)
Bob Vila's second season as host.

Season 3 (1982)
Bob Vila's third season as host.

Season 4 (1982)
Bob Vila's fourth season as the host.

Season 5 (1983–84)
Bob Vila's fifth season as the host.
Norm Abram grows a beard starting with this season.
Starting with this season, the show's titling got revamped as The All New This Old House.

Season 6 (1984–85)
Bob Vila's sixth season as the host.
Starting with this season, the host began talking to the homeowners. The pros names began appearing onscreen.
This is the last season to have the "flipping pages" closing credits. It had been used since Season 1.

Season 7 (1985–86)
Bob Vila's seventh season as the host.
Starting with this season, the closing credits no longer had flipping pages, they're now carded over a live-action scene.

Season 8 (1986–1987)
Bob Vila's eighth season as the host.

Season 9 (1987-1988)
Bob Vila's ninth season as the host.
Richard Trethewey is now clean shaven.

Season 10 (1988–89)
This is the last season with Bob Vila as the host. After 10 seasons and 234 episodes, Bob Vila says goodbye This Old House. He became a spokesman for Sears in 1989, and signed contracts with advertising agent Ogilvy & Mather, to create a syndicated home improvement show in 1990, called Home Again with Bob Vila. In 1991, the show's titling got revamped as Bob Vila's Home Again, which stayed until the end of the show's run in 2005. In 1989, Norm Abram launched a half-hour woodworking show, called The New Yankee Workshop, which ran for 21 seasons.
With Vila at the helm, This Old House began to broaden its scope. In addition to Vila hosting, several pros began hosting these segments.

References

External links

This Old House at cptv.org

This Old House